Conviction is a 2010 biographical legal drama film directed by Tony Goldwyn, written by Pamela Gray, and starring Hilary Swank and Sam Rockwell. The film premiered on September 11, 2010, at the Toronto International Film Festival and was released in the US on October 15, 2010.

Plot
Betty Anne Waters' life revolves around her brother Kenneth, who is now in prison for murder. Despite Kenny's knack for getting in trouble, they have always been close. After the murder of Katherina Reitz Brow on May 21, 1980, in Ayer, Massachusetts, Kenny is initially taken in for questioning by Sergeant Nancy Taylor, but released. Two years later, based on new testimony from two witnesses, Kenny is arrested and tried. The evidence presented at Kenny's trial is entirely circumstantial, but he is convicted of first degree murder and sentenced to life in prison without parole. The three main witnesses against him are Sergeant Taylor, his ex-wife Brenda, and ex-girlfriend Roseanna.

Three years later, Betty Anne lives with her husband, Rick and two sons, Richard and Ben. She is frantic that she has not heard from Kenny, who calls her every week from prison, and finally discovers that he tried to commit suicide. Betty Anne decides to go back to school and become a lawyer so she can exonerate him, but her husband is skeptical and unsupportive, and eventually they split up and later divorce. As Betty Anne struggles with being a working mother attending law school, flashbacks reveal that her mother was callous and uncaring, forcing Kenny and Betty Anne to fend for themselves. The two were very close, but frequently got into trouble, and were eventually taken away from their mother and sent to separate foster homes.

Betty Anne continues to visit Kenny in prison, working in a bar while going to school, but her busy schedule causes her to miss a planned outing with her sons, who decide they would be better off living with their father. Struggling in school, demoralized and exhausted, Betty Anne stops going to classes, until a friend from school, Abra, comes to her house and prods her to just get up, get dressed, and get back to class.

In a study group, Betty Anne learns about the new field of DNA testing and realizes that this could be the key to overturning Kenny's conviction, as only blood types had been matched at the time of the trial. She contacts attorney Barry Scheck from the Innocence Project. The backlog of cases will mean waiting at least 18 months unless she can pass the bar exam and find the blood evidence from Kenny's trial herself to have it tested. She passes the bar exam and begins working hard to get her brother out of jail. At first she is stonewalled, then told the evidence was destroyed, but she refuses to give up, and she and Abra embark on an odyssey to recover any evidence that might still be stored away somewhere.

In the process, Betty Anne learns that Nancy Taylor was fired from the police department for fabricating evidence in another case, which deepens Betty Anne's suspicions about Kenny's conviction and the evidence presented at trial. She is told that the evidence has been moved to the courthouse but after 10 years it was destroyed. Refusing to give up, she and Abra travel to Ayer and personally ask the courthouse supervisor to look through the records and the evidence is found. The DNA results come back and establish that the blood was not Kenny's. Betty Anne and Kenny are overjoyed anticipating his release, but Martha Coakley, of the District Attorney's office, refuses to vacate the conviction, claiming that there was still enough evidence to convict Kenny as an accomplice. Kenny is convinced that no matter what, the authorities will find a way to keep him in prison to avoid admitting their mistake. Betty Anne is heartbroken again, but refuses to give up after Scheck advises her that their discovery not only proves Kenny's innocence, but also that the main witnesses against him were lying.

Betty Anne, Abra, and Scheck visit the other two main trial witnesses, Kenny's ex-wife and his ex-girlfriend. Both tearfully confess that Sergeant Taylor coerced them into perjuring themselves at Kenny's trial. With an affidavit from Kenny's ex-wife and the DNA evidence, Kenny's conviction is vacated and he is freed from prison in June 2001. Betty Anne is able to persuade his daughter, Mandy, whom he had not had any contact with since she was a small child, that he never stopped trying to reach out to her while he was in prison. He is able to reconnect with his daughter, and is reunited with his sister and her sons.

The epilogue states that Betty Anne continues to work at the bar as well as with the Innocence Project to prevent wrongful convictions. She also won a major settlement against the Ayer police department for Kenny's conviction although Nancy Taylor (whom she also won the settlement against) was never charged because of the statute of limitations had expired. The real killer of Katherina Brow has never been found.

Cast

Production
Production began in February 2009, in Dexter, Michigan. Filming also took place in Ann Arbor, Howell, Pinckney, Chelsea and Ypsilanti. In Ypsilanti, filming took place in the historic Depot Town at a restaurant called Sidetrack Bar & Grill. In Howell, filming took place at the Livingston County Courthouse, along Dearborn Street at Cole's Elevator, and at the Howell Village Market (formerly Sefa's Super Market). The script was written by Pamela Gray. The poster was released June 21, 2010. Many scenes were also shot in Jackson Mi.  Some at the previous site of the Jackson Citizen Patriot newspaper and The current Jackson County Courthouse.

Music
The film score was composed by composer Paul Cantelon.

The end title song is "Heaven & Hell" by Cantelon's band, Wild Colonials. The song is a re-recording of the track that first appeared on their debut album, Fruit of Life and was released as a stand-alone single at the time of the film's release.

Reception
Review aggregator Rotten Tomatoes reports that 67% of critics have given the film a positive review based on 191 reviews, with an average score of 68%. The critical consensus reads "Less compelling – and more manipulative – than it should be, Conviction benefits from its compelling true story and a pair of solid performances from Swank and Rockwell." Another review aggregator Metacritic assigned the film a weighted average score of 61 out of 100, indicating "generally positive reviews".

Martha Coakley, Attorney General of the Commonwealth of Massachusetts, who was portrayed in the film, commented after seeing a pre-screening on October 12, 2010, that it was a compelling film but there were legal inaccuracies and temporal exaggerations. Family members of Katharina Brow, the murder victim, have criticized the film company and Hilary Swank for failing to consult the family on the movie's depiction of their mother. Kenny died in September 2001, six months after his exoneration, due to a head injury he sustained in an accident.

Accolades

See also
 List of wrongful convictions in the United States
 "Testilying"

References

Further reading

External links
 
 
 
 
 
 
 Conviction at The Numbers

2010 films
2010 biographical drama films
American biographical drama films
Films about miscarriage of justice
Films about lawyers
Fox Searchlight Pictures films
American films based on actual events
Films directed by Tony Goldwyn
Films set in Rhode Island
Films shot in Michigan
Films scored by Paul Cantelon
Films set in 2001
2010 drama films
2010s English-language films
2010s American films